{{DISPLAYTITLE:C2H5N}}
The molecular formula C2H5N (molar mass: 43.07 g/mol, exact mass: 43.0422 u) can refer to:

 Aziridine
 Ethanimine or its tautomer, vinylamine
 N-Methylmethanimine